Jack Martin (born 29 January 1995) is an Australian rules footballer who plays for the Carlton Football Club in the Australian Football League (AFL).

Early life
Martin was born in Broome, Western Australia to an Indigenous Australian mother (Yawuru) and father (Yamatji). The family moved to Geraldton, Western Australia when Jack was 12 years of age. He attended Geraldton Senior College during his high school years.

Martin made his senior football debut for the Towns Football Club in the Great Northern Football League at age 15. His team would reach the GNFL Grand Final later that year and he would line up on future Gold Coast Suns teammate Jaeger O'Meara on the wing. He was recruited from Claremont Football Club, who played in the West Australian Football League with the first selection in the 2012 incentive Mini Draft, a special draft of players who were too young to be eligible for selection in the main 2012 AFL Draft.

As part of the mini-draft rules, Martin was unable to play for the Gold Coast Suns in the 2013 season, but did play for them in the 2013 NAB Cup preseason competition and then with the reserve team in the North East Australian Football League.

AFL career
Martin made his AFL debut in Round 1 of the 2014 season against Richmond at Metricon Stadium. While attempting to take a diving mark in the fifth minute of the game, Martin injured his left AC joint and was subsequently substituted out of the game. It was initially feared he may be sidelined for the entire 2014 season but scans later revealed he would miss a minimum of two months. He was rushed back into the senior team for the Round 14 clash against Geelong despite not having played a game at any level since his injury.

Essendon confirmed interest in signing Martin, but Gold Coast were not open to a trade. Martin played the 2019 AFL season at Gold Coast. 

At the conclusion of the 2019 AFL season, Martin again requested a trade to Victoria. Carlton and the Western Bulldogs were both interested in signing him. He is expected to nominate Carlton as his preferred destination. After the Suns and Carlton failed to reach a deal during the trade period, Martin became a Blue in the 2019 pre-season draft.

AFL statistics
 Statistics are correct to the end of Round 23 2022

|- style="background-color: #EAEAEA"
! scope="row" style="text-align:center" | 2014
|style="text-align:center;"|
| 4 || 11 || 10 || 4 || 77 || 47 || 124 || 33 || 25 || 0.9 || 0.4 || 7.0 || 4.3 || 11.3 || 3.0 || 2.3
|-
! scope="row" style="text-align:center" | 2015
|style="text-align:center;"|
| 4 || 12 || 11 || 9 || 90 || 63 || 153 || 54 || 39 || 0.9 || 0.8 || 7.5 || 5.3 || 12.8 || 4.5 || 3.3
|- style="background-color: #EAEAEA"
! scope="row" style="text-align:center" | 2016
|style="text-align:center;"|
| 4 || 21 || 14 || 3 || 194 || 148 || 342 || 120 || 75 || 0.7 || 0.1 || 9.2 || 7.0 || 16.3 || 5.7 || 3.6
|-
! scope="row" style="text-align:center" | 2017
|style="text-align:center;"|
| 4 || 22 || 24 || 11 || 262 || 148 || 410 || 139 || 59 || 1.1 || 0.5 || 11.9 || 6.7 || 18.6 || 6.3 || 2.7
|- style="background-color: #EAEAEA"
! scope="row" style="text-align:center" | 2018
|style="text-align:center;"|
| 4 || 15 || 14 || 11 || 174 || 93 || 267 || 70 || 73 || 0.9 || 0.7 || 11.6 || 6.2 || 17.8 || 4.7 || 4.9
|-
! scope="row" style="text-align:center" | 2019
|style="text-align:center;"|
| 4 || 16 || 8 || 11 || 185 || 105 || 290 || 66 || 89 || 0.5 || 0.7 || 11.6 || 6.6 || 18.1 || 4.1 || 5.6
|- style="background-color: #EAEAEA"
! scope="row" style="text-align:center" | 2020
|style="text-align:center;"|
| 21 || 15 || 12 || 11 || 115 || 87 || 202 || 64 || 48 || 0.8 || 0.7 || 7.7 || 5.8 || 13.5 || 4.3 || 3.2
|-
|- style="background-color: #EAEAEA"
! scope="row" style="text-align:center" | 2021
|style="text-align:center;"|
| 21 || 11 || 8 || 6 || 94 || 46 || 140 || 61 || 26 || 0.7 || 0.5 || 8.5 || 4.2 || 12.7 || 5.5 || 2.4
|-
|- style="background-color: #EAEAEA"
! scope="row" style="text-align:center" | 2022
|style="text-align:center;"|
| 21 || 12 || 12 || 11 || 74 || 40 || 114 || 40 || 31 || 1.0 || 0.9 || 6.1 || 3.3 || 9.5 || 3.3 || 2.5
|-
|- class="sortbottom"
! colspan=3| Career
! 135
! 113
! 77
! 1264
! 777
! 2041
! 647
! 465
! 0.8
! 0.5
! 9.3
! 5.7
! 15.1
! 4.7
! 3.4
|}

References

External links

1995 births
Indigenous Australian players of Australian rules football
Australian rules footballers from Western Australia
Gold Coast Football Club players
Claremont Football Club players
Living people
People from Broome, Western Australia
Carlton Football Club players